Razvily is a rural locality (a village) in Toykinskoye Rural Settlement, Bolshesosnovsky District, Perm Krai, Russia. The population was 119 as of 2010. There are  4 streets.

Geography 
Razvily is located 23 km southwest of Bolshaya Sosnova (the district's administrative centre) by road. Krasnye Gorki is the nearest rural locality.

References 

Rural localities in Bolshesosnovsky District